Chandragupta Maurya  is an Indian Historical drama series being broadcast on Dangal TV, based on the life of Chandragupta Maurya, an Indian emperor of ancient India and the founder of the Mauryan Empire.  Chandragupta Maurya was first aired in March 2011 on Imagine TV. Ashish Sharma played the role of adult Chandragupta Maurya.

Summary
The story is about Chandragupta Maurya, who ruled over the Indian subcontinent in 300 BC. He would go on to become one of the greatest emperors in ancient India with his empire extending from Assam in the east to Afghanistan and Balochistan in the west.

The story begins with Chanakya, who goes to Dhana Nanda with the offer of Akhand Bharat (literally meaning Undivided India), but Dhana Nanda and his prime minister Amatya Rakshasa end up humiliating him. Chanakya then pledges to not tie a knot in his hair until he succeeded in overthrowing the Nanda dynasty. Whilst travelling to Takshashila, he meets Chandragupta and finding him suitable to achieve his dream of Akhand Bharat, (with the permission of Chandragupta's mother) takes Chandragupta to Takshashila. There they meet Prince Ambhik and his friends (Shashank, Digvijaya & Digamber), who as a group spare no expense in humiliating Chandragupta. This prompts Chandragupta to escape from Takshashila and return home to his village, but Dhana Nanda arrives with his army and destroys the village, killing Chandragupta's mother in front of him. Enraged, Chandragupta vows to destroy The Nanda Empire. 
With this in mind, Chandragupta begins training under Chanakya, who then takes him to train under various warriors, who themselves had suffered under the rule of Dhana Nanda. Chandragupta also takes part in a Vijay Yatra, winning it. When Chandragupta turns 13, Chanakya hatches a plan to kill Dhana Nanda and orders Chandragupta to execute it. Chandragupta manages to kill Dhana Nanda, but Prime Minister Rakshasa reveals that the real Dhana Nanda is still alive. It is shown that the Dhana Nanda had seven doppelgangers and Chandragupta had killed one of the doppelgangers. Chandragupta is shattered, but succeeds in escaping from the palace. On hearing of this, an enraged Chanakya decides to further train Chandragupta into an Excellent Warrior.
The show then skips ahead to 8 year in the future, where an adult Chandragupta is being played by Ashish Sharma. Chandragupta is still plotting on overthrowing the Nanda Empire. The show now introduces a new Character Alexander the Great, who is called Sikandar. Prince Ambhik readily joins hands with Sikandar. Together they defeat Porus and their armies enter India. When Chanakya hears about this, he determines that it is time for Chandragupta to rise to his true calling and they set out to gather the forces of India and defend the land from the Invaders.

Cast

Main 
 Ashish Sharma as Chandragupta Maurya, former Prince of Piplivan, first emperor of the Maurya Empire
 Rushiraj Pawar as Young Chandragupta Maurya
 Manish Wadhwa as Chanakya, a scholar from Takshashila, Chandragupta's adviser, Prime Minister of the Maurya Empire & also as Chanak, father of Chanakya
 Nidhi Tikoo as Durdhara, princess of Magadh, Chandragupta's wife

 Sooraj Thapar as Dhana Nanda emperor of Nanda Empire, sworn enemy of Chanakya & also as Mahapadma Nanda first emperor of Nanda Empire, father of Dhana Nanda

Recurring 
• Abhijeet Sooryvanshe as Spy of Rakshas( Tej Sapru)
 Malinee Sengupta as Chitraroopa 
 Rajeev Bharadwaj as Bhadrabhatt
 Romanch Mehta as Purushdatt
 Tej Sapru as Rakshas, the Prime Minister of the Nanda Empire and Dhana Nanda's closest associate
 Rohit Purohit as Bhadrasaal, the General of the Nanda Army and ruler of Sahal
 Ali Hassan as Virajas
 Mohak Meet as Aditya
 Sumeet Vyas as Ambhik Kumar, Ambhiraj's son and Durdhara's fiancé
 Nitin Prabhat as Ambhik Kumar
 Mohsin Shaikh as Sukant
 Manas Adhiya as Ghanghor
 Rishiraj Arya as Aerawat
 Ravi Patel as Akshay
 Ankit Arora as Chandragupta's father
 Deepti Dhyani as Mura
 Onkar Nath Mishra as Acharya Shreshtha
 Vishal Aditya Singh as Shashank
 Ankit Shah as Younger Shashank
 Lalit Negi as Digvijay
 Siddhharth Dhanda as Young Digvijay
 Tiya Gandwani as Mihika
 Tarun Khanna as Karvinath, ruler of Lokhandi
 Rajesh Shringarpure as Seleucus I Nicator, the first Emperor of the Seleucid Empire and Alexander the Great's former general
 Shiraz Hussain as Alexander the Great
 Bhupinder Singh as Porus
 Yashashri Masurkar as Mrignayani
 Ankit Kakkar as Aryeman
 Khan Jaan as Dadhich
 Raj Premi as Ahirya
 Ankit Arora as Senapati of Shishunaga Dynasty, friend and trainer of Mahapadma Nanda

See also 

Chandragupta Maurya
Chandragupta Maurya (2018 TV series)

References

External links

 

Imagine TV original programming
Indian television soap operas
2011 Indian television series debuts
2012 Indian television series endings
Indian period television series
Works about the Maurya Empire
Indian historical television series